Wilbur Higby (August 21, 1867 – December 1, 1934) was an American actor of the silent era. He appeared in more than 70 films between 1914 and 1934.

Stage
In the mid-1890s, Higby was a member of the stock company of the Grand Opera House in Boston, Massachusetts. Later in the 1890s and into the early 1900s, he performed with other stock groups in a variety of locales such as York, Pennsylvania; Rochester, New York; and Brooklyn, New York.

By 1903, Higby had his own troupe, the Wilbur Higby Dramatic Company, which was described in a newspaper article as "one of the highest class repertoire organizations in this country." Within four years, however, the Higby Company had apparently ceased to exist. A 1907 newspaper article described Higby as "leading man with the Morey Stock Co. this season."

Later life
Higby's daughter, Mary Jane Higby, was an actress in television and old-time radio who made one film appearance, as Janet Fay in The Honeymoon Killers. Higby died in Hollywood, California in 1934, aged 67, from pneumonia.

Selected filmography

 Lucille Love, Girl of Mystery (1914)
 The Master Key (1914)
 The Mysterious Rose (1914)
 At the Stroke of the Angelus (1915) (short)
 Hoodoo Ann (1916)
 Mixed Blood (1916)
 Diane of the Follies (1916)
 The Mainspring (1916)
 Might and the Man (1917)
 The Medicine Man (1917)
 Wild Sumac (1917)
 The Tar Heel Warrior (1917)
 A Girl of the Timber Claims (1917)
 An Old-Fashioned Young Man (1917)
 The Midnight Man (1917) as John Hardin
 I'll Get Him Yet (1919)
 True Heart Susie (1919)
 Nugget Nell (1919)
 Brass Buttons (1919)
 The Mayor of Filbert (1919)
 The Terror (1920)
 The Jailbird (1920)
 The Price of Redemption (1920)
 Desert Blossoms (1921)
 Play Square (1921)
 Live Wires (1921)
The Third Alarm  (1922)
 Do and Dare (1922)
 The Ladder Jinx (1922)
The Love Trap (1923)
 The Flaming Forties (1924)
 Confessions of a Queen (1925)
 Lights of Old Broadway (1925)
 God's Great Wilderness (1927)
 Morals for Women (1931)
  St. Louis Woman (1934)

References

External links

 newspaper clipping from 1904

1867 births
1934 deaths
American male film actors
American male silent film actors
Male actors from Mississippi
People from Meridian, Mississippi
Deaths from pneumonia in California
20th-century American male actors